Kristin Mary Jacobi (born 16 October 1931) is a former swimmer from New Zealand.

At the 1950 British Empire Games she won the silver medal as part of the women's 440 yard freestyle relay. Her teammates in the relay were Norma Bridson, Winifred Griffin and Joan Hastings.

References

1931 births
Living people
New Zealand female swimmers
Swimmers at the 1950 British Empire Games
Commonwealth Games silver medallists for New Zealand
Commonwealth Games medallists in swimming
Medallists at the 1950 British Empire Games